Senguio is a municipality in the Mexican state of Michoacán, located approximately  east of the state capital of Morelia.

Geography
It borders the Michoacanese municipalities of Maravatío to the north, Tlalpujahua to the east, Angangueo to the south, Aporo to the southwest, and Irimbo to the west. It also borders the municipality of San José del Rincón in the State of Mexico to the southeast.

As of 2009, the land cover in Senguio consists of temperate forest (48%) and grassland (12%). Another 38% of the land is used for agriculture and 0.8% consists of urban areas. Most of Senguio drains into the Lerma River, while the southernmost part of the municipality is located in the basin of the Cutzamala River, a tributary of the Balsas River. The forests in the southeastern part of the municipality are protected as part of the Monarch Butterfly Biosphere Reserve.

Senguio has a temperate climate with rain in the summer.

History
The place name Senguio is of Purépecha origin, meaning "limits". Prior to the arrival of the Spanish, Senguio was located in the frontier region between the Tarascan state and Aztec Empire and was inhabited by Mazahua tribes. The area was conquered by Cristóbal de Olid in 1522, and during the colonial period, the land was taken from the native inhabitants and incorporated into the Spanish haciendas, gradually leading to the disappearance of the indigenous peoples.

After Mexican independence, Senguio was made a part of the municipality of Irimbo in 1831. It became an independent municipality in 1856. It was re-incorporated into Irimbo in 1863, but re-established as 
a municipality in 1868.

Administration
The municipal government of Senguio comprises a president, a councillor (Spanish: síndico), and seven trustees (regidores), four elected by relative majority and three by proportional representation. The current president of the municipality is Rodolfo Quintana Trujillo.

Demographics
In the 2010 Mexican Census, the municipality of Senguio recorded a population of 18,427 inhabitants living in 4153 households. The 2015 Intercensal Survey estimated a population of 19,146 inhabitants in Senguio.

There are 55 localities in the municipality, of which only the municipal seat Senguio is classified as urban. It recorded a population of 2707 inhabitants in the 2010 Census.

Economy
Agriculture is the main economic activity in Senguio. Crops grown include corn and oats.

References

Further reading

Municipalities of Michoacán
1856 establishments in Mexico
States and territories established in 1856